Maybe They Will Sing for Us Tomorrow is the third studio album by American ambient/post-rock band Hammock. It was released on May 6, 2008 on Darla Records and was reissued in 2013 by the band's own label, Hammock Music.

In December 2008, American webzine Somewhere Cold ranked Maybe They Will Sing for Us Tomorrow No. 2 on their 2008 Somewhere Cold Awards Hall of Fame.

Track listing

References 

Hammock (band) albums
Hammock Music albums
2008 albums